The VBET Armenian Cup is the main football cup competition of Armenia. In its original form as the Armenian Cup, it started in 1939, when Armenia was a republic of the Soviet Union. It served as a qualification tournament for the Soviet Cup, and it was not disputed by Armenian teams in the Soviet League pyramid.  After Armenia gained independence in 1992, the cup became known as Independence Cup, and the final is held every year on 9 May.

Since 2022, it has been known as the Fastex Armenian Cup after its headline sponsor.

Finals

Soviet

1939	Dinamo Leninakan
1940	Dinamo Yerevan
1941–44	  not played
1945	Dinamo Yerevan
1946	Dinamo Yerevan
1947	  not played
1948	DO Yerevan
1949	DO Yerevan
1950	Karmir Drosh Leninakan
1951	Karmir Drosh Leninakan
1952	Shinarar Yerevan
1953	Himik Kirovokan
1954	Himik Kirovokan
1955	Karmir Drosh Leninakan
1956	FIMA Yerevan
1957	FIMA Yerevan
1958	Tekstilschik Leninakan
1959	Tekstilschik Leninakan
1960	Shinarar Yerevan
1961	Himik Kirovokan
1962	Motor Yerevan
1963	Lernagorts Kapan
1964	Aeroflot Yerevan
1965	Motor Yerevan
1966	Himik Yerevan
1967	Elektrotehnik Yerevan
1968	Araks Yerevan
1969	Motor Yerevan
1970	Motor Yerevan
1971	FIMA Yerevan
1972	FIMA Yerevan
1973	Aragats Leninakan
1974	FIMA Yerevan
1975	Kotayk Abovyan
1976	Kotayk Abovyan
1977	Kotayk Abovyan
1978	Kanaz Yerevan
1979	FIMA Yerevan
1980	Metroschin Yerevan
1981	MBVD Yerevan
1982	Metroschin Yerevan
1983	FIMA Yerevan
1984	Motor Yerevan
1985	Impuls Dilijan
1986	Schweinik Spitak
1987	Iskra Yerevan
1988	Kumairi Leninakan
1989	Almast Yerevan
1990	  not known
1991	  not known

Armenian

Winners and finalists

Results by team
Since its establishment, the Armenian Cup has been won by 9 different teams. Teams shown in italics are no longer in existence.

Consecutive winners
Two clubs have won consecutive Armenian Cups on more than one occasion: Ararat Yerevan (1993, 1994, 1995) and Pyunik (2013, 2014, 2015), .

See also
 List of football clubs in Armenia
 Sports in Armenia

References

External links
 List of Armenian Cup Finals (with links to full results) from RSSSF
 Armenian Cup finals between 1992 and 1999

 
C
Armenia